Angelo Boldini, (Labastide-Castel-Amouroux (Lot-et-Garonne), 24 October 1929 - Libourne, 5 April 1994) was a French rugby league footballer. He played as a prop, notably for Villeneuve-sur-Lot. Boldini also represented his country at the 1960 Rugby League World Cup.

Outside the field, he worked as a truck driver.

Rugby union career

Club

Honours

France

Rugby league career

Club 

 Bordeaux

 Villeneuve-sur-Lot

"Honours" 

Champion of France: 1954 (Bordeaux), 1958, 1959, (Villeneuve-sur-Lot
Champion of the Lord Derby Cup: 1958 (Villeneuve-sur-Lot)

International 

 France (11 caps) 1956-60

References

External links 

Angelo Boldini at rugbyleagueproject.com

1929 births
1994 deaths
French rugby league players
Sportspeople from Lot-et-Garonne
Rugby league props
Villeneuve Leopards players
France national rugby league team players